The Grand Master of the Order of Saint Lazarus (statuted 1910) is the leader of a fraternal order claiming legacy and contingency to the medieval Catholic military order, the Order of Saint Lazarus.

It claims continuity by assertion that during the period from 1814 to 1841, the order was under the direction of the Council of Officers with King Louis XVIII (1814-1824) and King Charles X (1824-1831) as Protectors of the joint Orders, and was then passed on, evolving into the current list of Grand Masters.

Council of Officers 

The Order lost its Royal Protection in 1831 but, according to some pretensions, continued to function under the direction of the Council of Officers.

Modern Order of Saint Lazarus  
The period following the loss of Temporal Protection of the French Royal Family in 1831 until 1910 is controversial. Some claim that the order did not survive, whereas some claim the period is at best shrouded in mystery since no contemporary documentation seems to have survived.

Modern tradition of the Order of Saint Lazarus (statuted 1910) maintains that, after 1841, the Melkite Greek Catholic Patriarchs assumed the leadership of the Order, as Hospitaller Nobles of St. Lazarus.

Malta obedience

Paris obedience

United Order  (reunification of the former Malta and Paris obediences)

Orléans obedience (since 2004)

References

External links
 Malta-Paris obedience of the Military and Hospitaller Order of Saint Lazarus of Jerusalem (under the Grand Mastership of Francisco de Borbón y Hardenberg)
 Orléans obedience of the Military and Hospitaller Order of Saint Lazarus of Jerusalem (under the Grand Mastership of Jan Dobrzensky z Dobrzenic)
 Research Library maintained by the Office of the Grand Archivist & Historian of the united MHOSLJ (this source provides access to the full original cartulary of the Order with original documents, including all the relevant original Papal Bulls, dating back to the 12th century)

 
Saint Lazarus